Zhang Rongqiao (born March 1966) is a Chinese physicist and aerospace engineer who is the chief designer of Tianwen-1, China's first mission to Mars.

Biography
He secondary studied at Qimen No.1 High School. In 1982, he was accepted to Xidian University. In 1991, he graduated from China Academy of Space Technology. He received his EMBA degree from Tsinghua University School of Economics and Management in 2002.

Zhang joined the Beijing Institute of Satellite Information Engineering. In 2004, he was transferred to the Lunar Exploration Center of the Commission for Science, Technology and Industry for National Defense, where he serves as the chief designer of Tianwen-1, China's first Mars probe. On May 30, 2021, he was elected as a member of the Standing Committee of the China Association for Science and Technology.

Zhang was included in a list of ten scientists who had had important roles in scientific developments in 2021 compiled by the scientific journal ''Nature.

References

1966 births
Living people
People from Huangshan
People from Qimen County
Scientists from Anhui
Xidian University alumni
Tsinghua University alumni
Academic staff of Xidian University